was an ashigaru (low class footman) who served the Okudaira family, retainer of Tokugawa Ieyasu. He became famous for his bravery and incredible exploit at the siege of Nagashino.  

He was a retainer of Okudaira Sadamasa and member of the Nagashino garrison when the fortress came under siege by the forces of Takeda Katsuyori, Kamehime the wife of Sadamasa assisted him in the defense. Torii already renowned for his bravery and known for his knowledge of the surroundings, he volunteered for the extremely dangerous mission of sneaking through the siege lines to request aid from Tokugawa Ieyasu in Okazaki. After successfully warning Tokugawa, however, he was captured by the Takeda on his return to Nagashino.

Torii was taken prisoner and directed to shout to his compatriots in the fortress that no help was on the way, and that they should surrender. He instead encouraged the garrison that Tokugawa's army was, in fact, on the way, and that they should keep fighting. 

There is some dispute as to whether Torii was crucified before or after this proclamation, as well as in the precise details of his execution. 

Nevertheless, the end result was the same. Although Sune'emon was an ashigaru class warrior, his family was promoted to samurai class and served the Okudaira family until the end of Edo period. One Takeda retainer, Ochiai Michihisa, even used an image of a crucified Torii Suneemon on his flag from then on. The flag is now stored in the University of Tokyo library.

In 1923, a railway station opened near Torii's deathplace was named Torii Station.

References

Turnbull, Stephen (1998). 'The Samurai Sourcebook'. London: Cassell & Co. pp. 68, 85, 226.

1540 births
1575 deaths
Samurai
People executed by crucifixion
Executed Japanese people
16th-century executions by Japan